The white-naped honeyeater (Melithreptus lunatus) is a passerine bird of the honeyeater family Meliphagidae native to eastern Australia. Birds from southwestern Australia have been shown to be a distinct species, Gilbert's honeyeater, and the eastern birds are more closely related to the black-headed honeyeater of Tasmania. One of several similar species of black-headed honeyeaters in the genus Melithreptus, it dwells in dry sclerophyll eucalypt woodland. Its diet consists of nectar from various flowers, and it also feeds on insects.

Taxonomy 
The white-naped honeyeater was originally described as Certhia lunata by French ornithologist Louis Jean Pierre Vieillot in 1802.  The specific epithet is derived from the Latin luna, meaning 'moon'; this refers to the crescent-shaped, white marking on its nape. It is a member of the genus Melithreptus, with several species of similar size and (apart from the brown-headed honeyeater) black-headed appearance, in the honeyeater family, Meliphagidae. The next closest relative outside the genus is the much larger, but similarly marked, blue-faced honeyeater. More recently, DNA analysis has shown honeyeaters to be related to the Pardalotidae (pardalotes), Acanthizidae (Australian warblers, scrubwrens, thornbills, etc.), and the Maluridae (Australian fairy-wrens) in the large superfamily Meliphagoidea.

Gilbert's honeyeater, found in southwest Western Australia, was initially described as a separate species by John Gould in 1844, before being reclassified as a subspecies of the white-naped for many years. However, a molecular study published in 2010 showed that it had diverged before the split of populations in eastern Australia into the white-naped and black-headed honeyeaters.

"White-naped honeyeater"  has been designated as the official common name for the species by the International Ornithologists' Union (IOC).

Description 

It is thinner than other similar species. Juveniles have brownish crowns and an orange base of  the bill. Its call is a mjerp mjerp.

Ecology 
It is found in eucalypt forest and woodlands. Its diet is principally nectar from a variety of flowers, supplemented by insects and various other invertebrates.

White-naped honeyeaters may nest from July to December, breeding once or twice during this time. The nest is a thick-walled bowl of grasses and bits of bark in the fork of a tall tree, usually a eucalypt. Two or three eggs are laid,  in size, and shiny, buff-pink, sparsely spotted with red-brown.

References

External links 
 

white-naped honeyeater
Articles containing video clips
white-naped honeyeater
Birds of New South Wales
Birds of Queensland
Birds of South Australia
Birds of Victoria (Australia)
Endemic birds of Australia
white-naped honeyeater